In category theory, a branch of mathematics, a Frobenius category is an exact category with enough projectives and enough injectives, where the classes of projectives and injectives coincide. It is an analog of a Frobenius algebra.

Properties
The stable category of a Frobenius category is canonically a triangulated category.

See also
 Dagger compact category
 Tannakian category

References 

Section 13.4 of 

Monoidal categories